Signoret may refer to:
 Felix Signoret (1825–1878), a member of the Common Council, the governing body of the city of Los Angeles
 Gabriel Signoret (1878-1937), a French silent film actor
 Simone Signoret (1921-1985), a French cinema actress
 Victor Antoine Signoret (1816-1889), a French pharmacologist, physician and entomologist